Midreshet Lindenbaum, originally named Michlelet Bruria, is a midrasha in Talpiot, Jerusalem. It counts among its alumnae many of the teachers at Matan, Nishmat, Pardes and other women's and co-ed yeshivas in Israel and abroad.

History
Michlelet Bruria was founded in 1976 by Rabbi Chaim Brovender, as the woman's component of Yeshivat Hamivtar. At Bruria, as in a traditional men's yeshiva, women studied in hevrutot (a traditional Jewish system of partner-based religious study) and learned Talmud as well as advanced Tanakh. In 1986, Bruria merged with Ohr Torah Stone Institutions and was renamed "Midreshet Lindenbaum" after Belda and Marcel Lindenbaum.

Programs
Midreshet Lindenbaum offers a certificate in "Halachik leadership", a five-year course in advanced studies in Jewish law, with examinations equivalent to the rabbinate's ordination requirement for men.
 It also runs a Torah study program for developmentally disabled young men and women known as Midreshet / Yeshivat Darkaynu.

The midrasha has been a leader in developing women's role in rabbinical courts in Israel and in founding the first school dedicated to training women to serve as advocates in rabbinical courts, known as Toanot Rabniyot. Lindenbaum also operates a legal aid center and hotline which has taken an active role in advocating for a resolution to the Agunah problem.

See also 
 Maharat
 Beit Midrash Har'el

References

Further reading 
 Tamar Ross, "Expanding the Palace of Torah: Orthodoxy and Feminism" Brandeis University Press, 2004.

External links 
 

Jewish seminaries
Modern Orthodox Judaism in Israel
Orthodox Jewish schools for women
Educational institutions established in 1976
Education in Jerusalem
Women rabbis and Torah scholars